Janina Madeleine Minge (born 11 June 1999) is a German footballer who plays as a midfielder for SC Freiburg and the Germany national team.

Club career
In 2015, Minge joined Bundesliga team SC Freiburg for the 2015–16 season at the age of 16 years.

International career
Minge made her debut for the U-15 national team in April 2013, in an 8–0 win over the Netherlands. She made three appearances for the under-16 national team in 2014. In 2015, she was the second youngest player in the U-17 national team squad for the European Championship in Iceland where the team reached the semi-finals but were defeated 1–0 by the Swiss selection. In May 2016, the team won the 2016 UEFA Women's Under-17 Championship after a penalty shootout against Spain in Belarus. The four Freiburg players in the squad contributed seven of Germany's ten goals at the tournament and two of them, including Minge, successfully converted their kicks in the shootout.

Career statistics

Honours
Germany
 UEFA Women's Under-17 Championship: 2016

References

External links

 
 
 
 

1999 births
Living people
People from Lindau
Sportspeople from Swabia (Bavaria)
Footballers from Bavaria
German women's footballers
Women's association football midfielders
SC Freiburg (women) players
Frauen-Bundesliga players
Germany women's youth international footballers
Germany women's international footballers